Nawabzaade is a 2018 Indian Hindi-language romantic comedy film directed by Jayesh Pradhan and produced by Lizelle D'Souza under R.D. Entertainment and Mayur K. Barot under T-Films. The film stars Raghav Juyal, Punit Pathak and Dharmesh Yelande in leading roles and debutante Isha Rikhi in a supporting role.  It was theatrically released on 27 July 2018 by AA Films.

Cast
Raghav Juyal as Karan
Punit Pathak as Abhishek 
Dharmesh Yelande as Salim 
Isha Rikhi as Sheetal
Zakir Hussain as Sheetal's father
Mukesh Tiwari as Premnath
Vinod Nahardih (Actor) as Chacha (tailor master)
Saif Ali Khan as Kathir Singh (Cameo)
Jyoti Joshi as Sheetal's mother
Varun Dhawan (special appearance in the song "High Rated Gabru")
Shraddha Kapoor (special appearance in the song "High Rated Gabru")
Shakti Mohan (special appearance in the song "Amma Dekh")
Athiya Shetty (special appearance in the song "Tere Naal Nachna")
Badshah (special appearance in the song "Tere Naal Nachna")
Sanjeeda Sheikh (special appearance in the song "Mummy Kasam")
Sunny Leone as Googly

Soundtrack

The music rights of the film were acquired by T-Series. 
The music was composed by Gurinder Seagal, Guru Randhawa and Badshah. While the song "High Rated Gabru" by Guru Randhawa, released by T-Series in 2017, was recreated for the film.
The first official song, High Rated Gabru (ft. Varun Dhawan and Shraddha Kapoor), was a remake of the song by singer Guru Randhawa, released on 28 June 2018, followed by Tere Naal Nachna on 5 July, which marked the bollywood singing debut of female punjabi singer Sunanda Sharma. The soundtrack album was released on 17 July 2018.

The song "Amma Dekh" is a remake of the song of "Amma Dekh Tera Munda" from the 1994 film Stuntman sung by Bali Brahmbhatt & Alka Yagnik, composed by Nadeem-Shravan and written by Sameer Anjaan but due to copyright issue was not included in the film and drop to a single.

See also
ABCD (franchise)

References

External links
 
 

Indian dance films
2010s Hindi-language films
Indian romantic comedy films
2018 romantic comedy films
Films scored by Guru Randhawa
Films scored by Badshah